Sir John Newlands  (4 August 1864 – 20 May 1932), also known as John Newland, was a Scottish-born Australian politician.

Born in Cawdor, Nairnshire, Newlands was the son of Andrew Newlands, agricultural labourer, and his wife Ann, née Stunar. Newlands was educated in Croy, Scotland before migrating to New South Wales, Australia in 1883. He married Theresa Glassey on 27 February 1884 in Adelaide, and that year began to use Newland as his surname. He became a railway worker, also in 1884, initially as a lamp cleaner and porter. While a conductor on the Broken Hill express, he and a fellow-conductor developed a gambling system that so impressed a group of mining magnates that they bankrolled a trip for the two to Monte Carlo. Fortune eluded them however, and they returned to Adelaide with a new respect for mathematics.
He was elected chairman of the District Council of Terowie, when after 13 years he was obliged to resign from the railways. He helped found in 1908 the Railway Officers' Association, a trade union of which he was appointed general secretary, a position he held until his resignation in 1913.

In November 1906 Newland was elected to the South Australian House of Assembly as the Labor member for Burra Burra. In February 1912 he lost his marginal seat in the 1912 state election, but was elected to the Australian Senate in the 1913 federal election as a Labor Senator for South Australia. He left the Labor Party in the 1916 split over conscription, joining the Nationalist Party. He served as Chairman of Committees from 1923 to 1926. On 1 July 1926, he was appointed President of the Senate, succeeding Thomas Givens. He held the presidency until 13 August 1929, when he was succeeded by Walter Kingsmill. He was knighted in 1927, and reverted his name to Newlands. He had several periods of convalescence due to ill health and died in 1932 in Glenelg, Adelaide, South Australia, while his term was still unexpired. No appointment was made.

See also
Hundred of Newland

References

External links
 
 

1864 births
1932 deaths
Australian Labor Party members of the Parliament of Australia
Nationalist Party of Australia members of the Parliament of Australia
Members of the Australian Senate for South Australia
Members of the Australian Senate
Presidents of the Australian Senate
Members of the South Australian House of Assembly
Australian Knights Commander of the Order of St Michael and St George
Australian politicians awarded knighthoods
Australian Commanders of the Order of the British Empire
National Labor Party members of the Parliament of Australia
United Australia Party members of the Parliament of Australia
Scottish emigrants to colonial Australia
20th-century Australian politicians
Mayors of places in South Australia
Conductor (rail)